Calamus Swamp is a  public preserve located  from Circleville in Pickaway County, Ohio, United States.  It has a natural kettle lake/wetland and is owned by the Columbus Audubon, the local chapter of Audubon.

History 
Calamus Swamp includes the only known kettle lake in central Ohio that is naturally vegetated and undisturbed. The kettle lake was made in the last ice age by the glacier that covered 2/3 of Ohio. 

When Ada May Burke and Sally V. May received the land, they donated it to Columbus Audubon, who then converted the land into a public preserve.

Plant Life 
According to the Columbus Audubon website, Calamus Swamp has a unique plant community. Because of the moist soil, trees such as the American Elm, Green Ash and, in places, Red and Silver maples can be found in the swamp forest.

Animals 
Calamus Swamp has a wide range of birds and animals.

Mammals that have been found in the area include raccoons, muskrats, groundhogs, opossums, and white-tailed deer.

The lake is home to other animals including the Ohio fairy shrimp, white leech, horse leech, giant water bug, pond snail, and the blood sucking leech.

References

External links
 Columbus Audubon website
 U.S. Geological Survey Map at the U.S. Geological Survey Map Website. Retrieved November 11th, 2022.

Protected areas of Pickaway County, Ohio
Nature reserves in Ohio
Swamps of Ohio
Landforms of Pickaway County, Ohio